Tricypha furcata is a moth in the family Erebidae. It was described by Heinrich Benno Möschler in 1878. It is found in French Guiana, Suriname, Brazil and Venezuela.

References

Moths described in 1878
Phaegopterina
Moths of South America